Several vessels have been named Union Island for Union Island.

All three vessels below had the same owner. 

 Union Island was launched at Bristol in 1773 as Sarah. She was Union Island by 1776. Her captain acquired a letter of marque in 1778, and again in 1779. In late 1779 she was sailing from St Augustine to Honduras when a French privateer captured her and took her into Cap François.
 , of 265 tons (bm), was a merchant vessel launched at Bristol in 1783 as a West Indiaman. Richard Tombs repaired and lengthened her in 1792. She was advertised for sale in 1793.
  was a merchant vessel launched at Bristol in 1794. She had the same master and owner as Union Island (1783 ship). In 1801, she participated in two single-ship actions. In the first, she repelled an attack by a Spanish privateer. In a later attack that year a French privateer captured her. She returned to English ownership in 1802. She then sailed as a West Indiaman until about 1818 when she started sailing between Liverpool and Africa. She was wrecked on 27 June 1821 on the coast of Africa.

Citations

Ship names